The homestead principle is the principle by which one gains ownership of an unowned natural resource by performing an act of original appropriation. Appropriation could be enacted by putting an unowned resource to active use (as with using it for produce some product),
joining it with previously acquired property or by marking it as owned (as with livestock branding).

Proponents of intellectual property hold that ideas can also be homesteaded by originally creating a virtual or tangible representation of them. Others argue that since tangible manifestations of a single idea will be present in many places, including within the minds of people, this precludes their being owned in most or all cases.

Homesteading is one of the foundations of Rothbardian anarcho-capitalism and right-libertarianism.

In political philosophy

John Locke 

In his 1690 work Second Treatise of Government, Enlightenment philosopher John Locke advocated the Lockean proviso which allows for homesteading.

Locke famously saw the mixing of labour with land as the source of ownership via homesteading:
Though the earth and all inferior creatures be common to all men, yet every man has a property in his own person. This nobody has any right to but himself. The labour of his body and the work of his hands, we may say, are  properly his. Whatsoever, then, he removes out of the state that Nature hath provided and left it in, he hath mixed his labour with it, and joined to it something that is his own, and thereby makes it his property.

However, Locke held that individuals have a right to homestead private property from nature only so long as "there is enough, and as good, left in common for others". The Lockean proviso maintains that appropriation of unowned resources is a diminution of the rights of others to it, and would only be acceptable if it does not make anyone else worse-off.

Pope Pius XI 
In his encyclical Quadragesimo Anno, Pope Pius XI confirms homesteading as the source of ownership:That ownership is originally acquired both by occupancy of a thing not owned by any one and by labor, or, as is said, by specification, the tradition of all ages as well as the teaching of Our Predecessor Leo clearly testifies. For, whatever some idly say to the contrary, no injury is done to any person when a thing is occupied that is available to all but belongs to no one; however, only that labor which a man performs in his own name and by virtue of which a new form or increase has been given to a thing grants him title to these fruits (Paragraph 52).

Murray Rothbard 

Libertarian philosopher and Austrian School economist Murray Rothbard argues that homesteading includes all the rights needed to engage in the homesteading action, including nuisance and pollution rights. He writes:
Most of us think of homesteading unused resources in the old-fashioned sense of clearing a piece of unowned land and farming the soil. ... Suppose, for example, that an airport is established with a great deal of empty land around it. The airport exudes a noise level of, say,  decibels, with the sound waves traveling over the empty land. A housing development then buys land near the airport. Some time later, the homeowners sue the airport for excessive noise interfering with the use and quiet enjoyment of the houses.

Excessive noise can be considered a form of aggression but in this case the airport has already homesteaded  decibels worth of noise. By its prior claim, the airport now "owns the right" to emit  decibels of noise in the surrounding area. In legal terms, we can then say that the airport, through homesteading, has earned an easement right to creating  decibels of noise. This homesteaded easement is an example of the ancient legal concept of "prescription", in which a certain activity earns a prescriptive property right to the person engaging in the action.

Rothbard interprets the physical extent to which a homesteading act establishes ownership in terms of the relevant "technological unit", which is the minimal amount necessary for the practical use of the resource. He writes:

Anthony de Jasay 
Hungarian political philosopher Anthony de Jasay argued that a homesteader, having a claim prior to any other, must be prima facie considered the owner of the resource, in accordance with the principle "let ownership stand":

[If] taking first possession of a thing is a feasible act of his that is admissible if it is not a tort (in this case not trespass) and violates no right; but this is the case by definition, i.e., by the thing being identified as "unowned". Taking exclusive possession of it is, in terms of our classification of possible acts, a liberty, and as such only a contrary right can obstruct or oppose it.

 14   The opponent of this simple thesis is trying to have it both ways: He is both asserting that the thing has no legitimate first owner from whom a second or nth owner could have legitimately obtained it by  agreed transfer, and that there is nevertheless somebody who has been and still is entitled to use the thing and therefore can validly object to being excluded from it. But an entitlement to use the thing is an at least partial antecedent ownership claim needing an owner, or the permission of an owner, before it can be made; ownership cannot both exist yet not exist.

 If, on the other hand, the objectors have been using the thing without being entitled to it, because no third  party had excluded them by taking first possession, and because they were unable, unwilling, or  uninterested to perform  the act of taking first possession themselves (whatever that act may consist of), their enjoyment of the thing was precarious, not vested. Its appropriation by a third party may have deprived them of an uncovenanted advantage, but it did not violate their rights.

Hans-Hermann Hoppe 

Similarly to de-Jasay, Hans-Hermann Hoppe argues that the denial of the homesteading rule entails a performative contradiction. That is because honest argumentation must presuppose an intersubjectively ascertainable (i.e. justifiable) norm, and all norms not relying on the original establishment of a physical (and therefore evident) link to the owner are subjective in nature, and therefore contradict the presuppositions of argumentation. He writes:
 Further, if one were not allowed to appropriate other resources through homesteading action, i.e., by putting them to use before anybody else does, or if the range of objects to be homesteaded were somehow limited, this would only be possible if ownership could be acquired by mere decree instead of by action. However, this does not qualify as a solution to the problem of ethics, i.e., of conflict-avoidance, even on purely technical grounds, for it would not allow one to decide what to do if such declarative claims happened to be incompatible.

 More decisive still, it would be incompatible with the already justified self-ownership, for if one could appropriate resources by decree, this would imply that one could also declare another person's body to be one's own. Thus, anyone denying the validity of the homesteading principle – whose recognition is already implicit in arguing two persons' mutual respect for each other's exclusive control over his own body – would contradict the content of his proposition through his very act of proposition making.

Ayn Rand 
Ayn Rand has not elaborated on the characteristics of homesteading, but she had expressed support for compatible laws such as favourably citing the Homestead Act (1862):
A notable example of the proper method of establishing private ownership from scratch, in a previously ownerless area, is the Homestead Act of 1862, by which the government opened the Western frontier for settlement and turned "public land" over to private owners. The government offered a 160 acre farm to any adult citizen who would settle on it and cultivate it for five years, after which it would become  property.

Although that land was originally regarded, in law, as "public property", the method of its allocation, in fact, followed the proper principle (in fact, but not in explicit ideological intention). The citizens did not have to pay the government as if it were an owner; ownership began with them, and they earned it by the method which is the source and root of the concept of "property": By working on unused material resources, by turning a wilderness into a civilized settlement. Thus, the government, in this case, was acting not as the owner but as the custodian of ownerless resources who defines objectively impartial rules by which potential owners may acquire them.

Linda and Morris Tannehill 
Linda and Morris Tannehill argue in The Market for Liberty that physically claiming the land (e.g. by fencing it in or prominently staking it out) should be enough to obtain good title:
But this theory runs into difficulties when one attempts to explain what is meant by 'mixing labor with land'. Just how much labor is required, and of what sort? If a  digs a large hole in his land and then fills it up again, can he be said to have mixed his labor with the land? Or is it necessary to effect a somewhat permanent change in the land?

 If so, how permanent? ... Or is it necessary to effect some improvement in the economic value of the land? If so, how much and how soon? ... Would a man lose title to his land if he had to wait ten months for a railroad line to be built before he could improve the land? ... And what of the naturalist who wanted to keep his land exactly as it was in its wild state to study its ecology? ... [M]ixing one's labor with the land is too ill-defined a concept and too arbitrary a requirement to serve as a criterion of ownership.

In law 
There are two different legal systems from which land ownership, and its scope, derive: Common law and statute law. One of the frequent issues of contention in both cases is the ownership of resources passing across property, such as streams or rivers, to which others downstream may assert property / water rights, and underground resources, such as subterranean water and minerals.

For limits to ownership above land, an old principle in the law is ad coelum, meaning that property rights extend "to the sky" (and below the earth). In the past, rights to "the sky" have been unenforcable – birds need take little notice of humans' overhead property rights – but with modern technology extending human reach, the idea of ad coelum rights may change.

Common law 

Common law provides the ad coelum ("to the sky") doctrine by which landowners own everything below and above the land, up to the sky and below the earth to its core, with the exception of volatile minerals such as natural gas. The rules governing what constitutes homesteading were not specified by common law but by the local statutory law. Common law also recognizes the concept of adverse possession ("squatters' rights"). Murray Rothbard criticized this doctrine as incompatible with his own homestead principle as a literal application prevent aircraft from traveling over someone's land, further arguing:
But is the practical problem of aviation the only thing wrong with the ad coelum rule? Using the homesteading principle, the ad coelum rule never made any sense, and is therefore overdue in the dustbin of legal history. If one homesteads and uses the soil, in what sense is he also using all the sky above him up into heaven? Clearly, he isn't.

So long as the aircraft did not damage or disturb the land, the owner would not have a claim. By the same principle, ownership of mineral and water resources on or under the land would also require homesteading, otherwise being left unowned.

Statutory law 
In the 19th century, a number of governments formalized the homestead principle by passing laws that would grant property of land plots of certain standardized size to people who would settle on it and "improve" it in certain ways (typically, built their residence and started to farm at least a certain fraction of the land). Typically, such laws would apply to territories recently taken from their indigenous inhabitants, and which the state would want to have populated by farmers. Examples include:
 New South Wales: Crown Lands Acts (1861)
 Canada: Dominion Lands Act (1872)
 United States: Florida Armed Occupation Act (1842), Homestead Act (1862)

See also 

 Classical liberalism
 Entitlement theory
 Estate in land
 Factors of production
 Finders, keepers
 Georgism
 Labor theory of property
 Land rights
 Lockean proviso
 Occupatio
 Positive law
 Possession as nine-tenths of the law
 Seasteading
 Squatting

Footnotes

References

External links 
 

Legal doctrines and principles
Property law
Libertarian theory
Anarchist theory
Ethics